Houttuynia is a genus of two species in the Saururaceae native to Southeast Asia. One species, H. cordata, is widely cultivated as a culinary herb. The genus was originally described in 1783 by Carl Peter Thunberg when he formally described H. cordata as the only species. It remained a monotypic genus until 2001 when Zheng Yin Zhu and Shi Liang Zhang discovered and described a second species native to China, H. emeiensis but the validity still unestablished. It was named after Martinus Houttuyn.

References

Piperales genera
Saururaceae